The 1964 San Francisco 49ers season was the franchise's 15th season in the National Football League, their 19th overall and the second under head coach Jack Christiansen. They improved on their 2–12 record from 1963, with 4 wins to 10 losses. However the team failed to qualify for playoffs for the 7th consecutive season.

Offseason

NFL Draft
The 49ers held the first pick in the draft and selected Dave Parks from Texas Tech. With their third pick, the 49ers selected linebacker Dave Wilcox, who would be inducted into the Pro Football Hall of Fame in 2000.

Regular season
Six games into his rookie season, Dave Parks set a franchise record for longest reception with an 83-yard catch, followed by the team's second longest reception, an 80-yarder, a week later. Both records stood for 13 years.

Schedule

Standings

Roster

Awards, records, and honors

References

External links
 1964 49ers on Pro Football Reference

San Francisco 49ers seasons
San Francisco 49ers
San Fran
San Fran 49